Lophocampa mixta is a moth of the family Erebidae. It was described by Berthold Neumoegen in 1882. It is found in the United States in Arizona, Texas

The wingspan is about 37 mm.

The larvae feed on Quercus emoryi.

References

 
Lophocampa mixta at BOLD Systems

mixta
Moths described in 1882